No Going Back is a reality television programme originally broadcast on Channel 4 in the United Kingdom. It follows the attempts of Britons, usually couples, as they try to renovate or build homes abroad.

Channel 4 original programming